The list of Delta Chi brothers includes initiated and honorary members of the Delta Chi fraternity.

Notable alumni

Government

 Jim Banks, Indiana, 2001 - former Indiana State Senator and current Congressman
 Otis R. Bowen, Indiana, 1939 - former Governor of Indiana and Secretary of Health and Human Services
 John Bricker, Ohio State, 1916 - past Governor and US Senator from Ohio
 William Jennings Bryan, Georgetown - US Congressman; US Secretary of State; US presidential candidate
 Doyle Carlton, Chicago, 1912 - 25th Governor of Florida
 Carey Cavanaugh, Florida, 1976 - former US Ambassador and peace negotiator
 George N. Craig, Arizona, 1932 - former Governor of Indiana
 Larry Craig, Idaho, 1976 - former US Senator from Idaho
 Robert Garcia, Long Beach State, 1999 - Mayor of the City of Long Beach
 Ronald 'Bo' Ginn, Georgia Southern, 1978 - former US Representative from Georgia
 Benjamin Harrison, Miami University - 23rd President of the United States
 Henry Hartsfield, Auburn, 1974 - space shuttle commander
 Henry "Scoop" Jackson, Washington, 1934 - late Senator from Washington and presidential candidate
 Sam Johnson, SMU, 1951 - US House of Representatives
 Dan Mica, Florida, 2012 - United States House of Representatives
 John L. Mica, Florida, 1967 - US House of Representatives, Florida
 Dan Miller, Florida, 1964 - former US Representative, Florida
 Matthew Neely, West Virginia, 1904 - former Governor of West Virginia, 1941–1945
 Edward R. O'Malley, Cornell, 1891 - New York State Attorney General; New York Supreme Court Justice
 Reince Priebus, University of Wisconsin–Whitewater - Chairman of the Republican National Committee
 William S. Sessions, Kansas, 1951 - former Director of the FBI
 Richard Shelby, Alabama, 1967 - US Senator, Alabama
 Bob Stump, Arizona State, 1951 - former US Representative, Arizona
 Craig Thomas, Wyoming, 1992 - late US Senator, Wyoming
 Robert Smith Vance, Alabama, 1950 - late Eleventh Circuit Court of Appeals Judge from Alabama
 George Wallace, Alabama, 1965 - former Governor of Alabama, U.S. Presidential candidate
 James Henry "Jim" Webb, Jr., Southern California, 1967 - US Senator, Virginia; former Secretary of the Navy
 James Herbert Wilkerson, DePauw, 1899 - US District Court Judge
 Bill Zeliff, Connecticut, 1959 - former US Representative from New Hampshire

Industry and finance
 Mel Fisher, Purdue, 1945 - treasure hunter
 Samuel Ginn, Auburn, 1959 - Chairman and CEO of Vodafone AirTouch, PLC
 Thomas Glasgow, Michigan State, 1968 - former Chief Operations Officer of McDonald's Corp.
 Herb Klein, Southern California, 1945 - newspaper editor; former Press Secretary to President Nixon
 George Tiller, Kansas, 1964 - physician and director of a women's health care services clinic in Wichita who performed late-term abortions; murdered on May 31, 2009
 Paul Waterman, Michigan State, 1987 - CEO of BP Lubricants Castrol
 Chauncey W.W. "Tex" Cook, Texas, 1930 - former chairman & CEO of General Foods
 Reinhold Schmieding, Michigan State University, 1977 -  An American billionaire businessman and the founder and CEO of Arthrex.
 Seth Klarman Cornell University, 1979 - An American billionaire investor, hedge fund manager, and author. He is the chief executive and portfolio manager of the Baupost Group.

Arts and entertainment
 Adam Levine, Colorado 1988 – Artist management
 Alan Horn, Union, 1965 – President and Chief Operating Officer of Warner Brothers Studios, Former President/COO of 20th Century Fox
 Alex Albrecht, American, 1998 - actor and podcaster
 Ben Becker, America, 1993 - ESPN sportscaster
 Jarrett Bellini, American, 2001 - writer and humorist, CNN.com
 Kevin Costner, Cal State Fullerton, 1974 - actor, director, and producer
 Brad Ellis, Berkeley, 1992 - composer and singer; All-American offensive lineman
 Kirk Fogg, Fullerton, 1981 - host of Nickelodeon show Legends of the Hidden Temple
 Chuck Goudie, "Michigan State, 1977" - investigative reporter, ABC Chicago
 Tom Graeff, UCLA, 1952 - film writer, director and editor; known for Teenagers from Outer Space
 Ashton Kutcher, Iowa, 2000 - actor
 David Moretti, Southern California, 2002 - actor, The Lair
 Russel B. Nye, Wisconsin, 1935 - Pulitzer Prize-winning author
 Richard Peck, Depauw, 1956 - Newbery Medal-winning author of children’s books
 Robert Newton Peck, Rollins, 1953 - writer of children's books, including the Soup series
 Bill Pidto, Cornell, 1987 - ESPN sportscaster
 G. D. Spradlin, Oklahoma, 1941 - actor
 James B. Stewart, Depauw, 1973 - author of Bloodsport 
 Peter van Steeden, NYU, 1925 - musical conductor

Sports
 Christian Castaneda, South Florida, 2011- Right Wing Midfielder Hertha BSC, Berlin, Germany; United States Men's National Team
 Jon Daniels, Cornell, 1999 - General Manager for the Texas Rangers; youngest GM in baseball history
 Tommy Deckard, Indiana, 1938 - member of the 1936 Olympic team; former world record holder in steeplechase
 Rod Dedeaux, Southern California, 1935 - former USC coach and college baseball's "Coach of the Century"
 Jack Del Rio, Southern California, 1985 - former Head Coach of the Oakland Raiders and Jacksonville Jaguars
 Mark Dominik, Kansas, 1993 -  current General Manager of the Tampa Bay Buccaneers
 Pat Gillick, Southern California, 1958 - baseball executive; member of the 2011 Major League Baseball Hall of Fame class
 Nolan Harrison, Indiana, 1990 - former NFL lineman
 Larry Himes, Southern California, 1964 - former General Manager for the Chicago Cubs
 Michael Huyghue, Cornell, 1984 - sports lawyer and businessman
 Don Lash, Indiana University, 1937 - winner of the 1938 James E. Sullivan Award as the outstanding amateur athlete in the US
 Ron Mix, Southern California, 1960 - NFL Hall of Fame member
 A.J. Preller, Cornell, 1999 - General Manager for the San Diego Padres
 Sean Salisbury, Southern California, 1985 - former NFL quarterback and former ESPN analyst
 Frank Sommer, Pennsylvania, 1910 - former Head Football Coach of Michigan State
 Scott Studwell, Illinois, 1976 -  former star Illinois linebacker, two-time Minnesota Viking Pro Bowler
 Don Thorp, Illinois, 1985 - former Illinois defensive tackle who saw NFL play briefly for three years
 Rick Welts, Washington, 1975 - current President and Chief Operating Officer for the Golden State Warriors

Education and academia
 Carey Cavanaugh, Florida, 1976 - Director of Patterson School of Diplomacy and International Commerce, University of Kentucky

References

Lists of members of United States student societies
brothers